Ý Yên is a rural district of Nam Định province in the Red River Delta region of Vietnam. As of 2003 the district had a population of 241,689. The district covers an area of 240 km². The district capital lies at Lâm.

References

Districts of Nam Định province